Navghan Kuvo is a stepwell in Uparkot Fort, Junagadh, Gujarat, India.

History
Navghan Kuvo is named after the Chudasama king Ra Navaghana. The forecourt to reach the well was probably built during his reign in 11th century. It is believed to have been completed by his son Khengara.

The well is considered older than the forecourt. It is an oldest example of the stepwell according to some scholars. It is near the Uparkot Caves. The well might have been built in Kshatrapa period (2nd-4th century) or in Maitraka period (6th-7th century).

It is a state protected monument (S-GJ-116).

Architecture
A small staircase entered through an arched doorway leads to the forecourt. The well is located at the far end of the forecourt. The water in the well is reached by a circular staircase which is cut in the soft rock behind thin stone wall of the shaft of well. The flight of the steps, first straight and then transverse, turns right around the shaft. The array of square holes in the stone wall of the shaft illuminate and cool the inside.

Gallery

See also
 Adi Kadi Vav
 Rani ki vav
 History of stepwells in Gujarat
 Stepwell

References

Stepwells in Gujarat
Junagadh
Tourist attractions in Junagadh district
Monuments and memorials in Gujarat